The Galway-Waterford rivalry is a hurling rivalry between Irish county teams Galway and Waterford, who first played each other in 1938. The rivalry has been an infrequent one due to both teams playing in different provincial championships. Galway's home ground is Pearse Stadium and Waterford's home ground is Walsh Park, however, most of their championship meetings have been held at neutral venues.

Statistics

All time results

Legend

Senior championship

References

Waterford
Waterford county hurling team rivalries